The Clovelly Garden Apartments, also known as Holman Gardens, are a historic apartment complex located in northeast Portland, Oregon, United States. Built in 1928 in the Tudor Revival style, they are a fine example of the garden apartments popular in Portland in the late 1920s and early 1930s. They were designed by prominent architect Carl L. Linde (1864–1945) under commission to George Nease (1874–1958), an influential timber businessman. They contain light fixtures designed by Fred Baker (1887–1981), recognized as a master lighting designer in Portland in that period.

The apartments were listed on the National Register of Historic Places in 1983.

See also
 National Register of Historic Places listings in Northeast Portland, Oregon

References

External links

Oregon Historic Sites Database entry

1928 establishments in Oregon
Carl L. Linde buildings
Northeast Portland, Oregon
Piedmont, Portland, Oregon
Portland Historic Landmarks
Residential buildings completed in 1928
Apartment buildings on the National Register of Historic Places in Portland, Oregon
Tudor Revival architecture in Oregon